is a Japanese regional airline headquartered in Shimizu-ku, Shizuoka, Shizuoka Prefecture. It operates a fleet of Embraer E-Jets with three main hubs at Shizuoka Airport, Nagoya Airfield and Kobe Airport. The airline commenced operations on July 23, 2009.

History 
Prior to the airline's establishment, Suzuyo & Co., Ltd. signed a purchase agreement with Embraer on November 30, 2007 for two Embraer E170s for its startup airline, with a purchase right to acquire one additional aircraft. The contract value was estimated to be approximately US$87 million, if the purchase right was exercised. At that time, the yet-to-be-established airline was Embraer's second customer in Japan. Suzuyo later established the airline as Fuji Dream Airlines on June 24, 2008 with an initial capital of ¥450 million, with Yohei Suzuki serving as the airline's president and chief executive officer (CEO).

On October 27, 2008, Embraer received the type certification from the Japan Civil Aviation Bureau (JCAB) to operate the Embraer E170 in Japan, with Fuji Dream Airlines receiving its first Embraer E170 on February 20, 2009 as Embraer's second Japanese customer, following J-Air. On June 15, 2009, the contract between Embraer and the airline was amended, allowing for the airline to acquire the larger Embraer E175, which was delivered in January 2010.
 
The airline's inaugural flight occurred on July 23, 2009, with its initial operations consisting of two daily flights to Komatsu Airport and one daily flight each to Kagoshima and Kumamoto from its home base at Shizuoka Airport. On April 1, 2010, the airline commenced three daily flights between Matsumoto Airport to Fukuoka and one daily flight between Matsumoto and Sapporo Chitose, taking over the services of Japan Airlines (JAL) on the routes as part of a new codeshare agreement.

Fuji Dream's route network expanded further as the airline received new aircraft, including services from Shizuoka and Nagoya Airfield (Nagoya Komaki) to Fukuoka in October 2010, services from Nagoya Komaki to Kumamoto and from Shizuoka to Sapporo Chitose in March 2011, services from Nagoya Komaki to Aomori and Hanamaki in August 2011, and service between Fukuoka and Niigata in October 2011. In January 2013, the airline added Kōchi Airport as a new destination with services from Nagoya Komaki beginning in March 2013. In March 2014, the airline added Yamagata Airport as a new destination with services from Nagoya Komaki. In March 2015, the airline added new service to Izumo and Kitakyushu from Nagoya Komaki. In April 2016, the airline announced service to a second Sapporo airport, with flights to Okadama Airport from Shizuoka beginning in June 2016.

In January 2018, Fuji Dream Airlines announced routes from Izumo to both Shizuoka and Sendai Airport as a new destination, beginning in March and April 2018 respectively. During late 2019, the airline added new routes to Kobe Airport, with services from Izumo, Kochi, and Matsumoto.

Corporate affairs 
The head office of Fuji Dream Airlines is in Shimizu-ku, Shizuoka Prefecture. The airline is a wholly owned subsidiary of Suzuyo & Co., Ltd., whose core businesses include domestic and international logistics.

On June 22, 2020, the airline appointed Shunichi Kususe as CEO and Tokuyasu Miwa as company president, following former president and CEO Yohei Suzuki's retirement from the airline.

Destinations  

, Fuji Dream Airlines operates or has operated scheduled flights to the following destinations in Japan:

Codeshare agreements 
Fuji Dream Airlines has a codeshare agreement with Japan Airlines.

Fleet 

, Fuji Dream Airlines operates the following aircraft:

Fleet development
Fuji Dream Airlines launched in July 2009 with an initial fleet of two Embraer E170 aircraft, before receiving its first Embraer E175 aircraft in January 2010 and an additional E170 and E175 in October 2010, with the airline's fleet by then consisting of three E170s and two E175s. The airline's Embraer E175 fleet continued to grow in subsequent years, with orders for one E175 and one purchase right in October 2010, two E175s in December 2012, three E175s with three purchase rights in July 2014, three E175s with three purchase rights in June 2017, and two E175s in June 2019.

In June 2017, the airline had expressed interest in both the Embraer E190-E2 and Mitsubishi MRJ (later the SpaceJet) in order to operate aircraft with a higher seating capacity, but in the case of the SpaceJet had decided to wait for the aircraft's eventual launch to observe its operating performance before making a decision.

Livery
Fuji Dream Airlines' aircraft livery consists of a solid color across the aircraft's fuselage, engines, and wingtips, with the airline's wordmark and name written on the fuselage, usually in white. Individual aircraft are given a unique color scheme making them distinct from one another, such as in red, light blue, green, gold, silver, or violet. The vertical stabilizer (tail fin) features the airline's logo, itself resembling Mount Fuji backed by a morning sunrise, colored to mirror the aircraft's given color scheme, with the exception of the logo's uppermost yellow stripe, resembling the morning sun. One aircraft, an Embraer E175 registered JA12FJ, instead features a predominantly inverted color scheme consisting of a solid white fuselage, with the airline's wordmark, logo, engines, and wingtips largely painted in the brand's standard red color.

Cabin and services
On the airline's flights, complimentary refreshment services are offered. The airline also has an in-flight magazine titled Dream 3776, with its name originating and derived from the airline's name and Mount Fuji's  elevation.

With the increasing length of some of the airline's flights and routes, especially those of its charter flights, the airline has also considered the addition of in-flight Wi-Fi access.

References

External links 

 
  
 Suzuyo & Co., Ltd. (Japanese)

Airlines established in 2008
Airlines of Japan
Companies based in Shizuoka Prefecture
Japanese companies established in 2008
Shizuoka (city)